Brushes are templates used in some 3D video game engines, such as the Quake engine, its derivatives the GoldSrc and Source game engines, or the Unreal Engine, to construct levels. Brushes can be primitive shapes (such as cubes, spheres and cones), pre-defined shapes (such as staircases), or custom shapes (such as prisms and other polyhedra).

During the map compilation process, brushes are turned into meshes that can be rendered by the game engine. Often brushes are restricted to convex shapes only, as this reduces the complexity of the binary space partitioning process. However, using CSG operations, complex rooms and objects can be created by adding, subtracting and intersecting brushes to and from one another. Additionally, brushes can be used as liquids or as an area trigger.

References

Video game development